Saraca griffithiana (in the family Fabaceae Lindl.) is a tree native to Yunnan Province of China and also to Burma (Myanmar). It is a forest tree sometimes attaining a height of 18 m (54 feet). It can be distinguished from the related Saraca dives  by its short bracts less than 5 mm long, and by its articulate petioles.

Saraca griffithiana , It was first described and published J. Asiat. Soc. Bengal, Pt. 2, Nat. Hist. Vol.66 on page 491 in 1897.

References

griffithiana
Trees of China
Trees of Myanmar
Flora of Yunnan
Plants described in 1897